Gee is a former community in Pushmataha County, Oklahoma, United States, 11 miles southeast of Clayton.  

A United States Post Office operated there from May 22, 1909, to November 30, 1911.  

No longer in existence, it was named for Henry V. Gee, first postmaster.  Gee (1868-1916) is buried in the cemetery in Nolia, a nearby community. 

More information on Gee and the Little River valley may be found in the Pushmataha County Historical Society.

References 

Geography of Pushmataha County, Oklahoma
Ghost towns in Oklahoma